Daehyeon-dong is the name of the following neighbourhoods:
 Daehyeon-dong, Seoul
 Daehyeon-dong, Daegu, a subdivision of Buk District, Daegu
 Daehyeon-dong, Ulsan